Vicente Carlos Campillo Candel (born 22 April 1951) is a retired Spanish football player and manager.

Career
Born in Santomera, Region of Murcia, Campillo's career as a player ended prematurely due to a knee injury. In 1984, he became manager of Real Murcia's reserves and, late into the season, as the first team had already been virtually relegated from La Liga, he replaced Eusebio Ríos at the helm of the latter, going on to achieve promotion the following campaign, as champions.

Campillo was fired in early October 1986, following a 3–1 away loss against Real Betis. He was one of three coaches during that season, where the team ranked 11th after both the regular season and the second stage. 

After leaving the Estadio de La Condomina, with the exception of three incomplete spells in Segunda División (being relegated with Murcia in 1994 and Écija Balompié in 1997) Campillo worked exclusively in the lower leagues. His last job was at Orihuela CF, where he was in charge until 20 November 2006.

References

External links

1951 births
Living people
People from Huerta de Murcia
Spanish footballers
Footballers from the Region of Murcia
Spanish football managers
La Liga managers
Segunda División managers
Real Murcia managers
Córdoba CF managers
Orihuela Deportiva CF managers
Hércules CF managers
CF Extremadura managers
Écija Balompié managers
Xerez CD managers
CP Cacereño managers
FC Cartagena managers
Association footballers not categorized by position